Pooh's Heffalump Halloween Movie (also known as Pooh's Heffalump Halloween: The Movie) is a 2005 American direct-to-video animated comedy film produced by Walt Disney Pictures and DisneyToon Studios, featuring the characters from Winnie the Pooh franchise and it was the sequel to Pooh's Heffalump Movie. This was the final Winnie the Pooh film to be produced by DisneyToon Studios before its closure in 2018.

The film marked voice actor John Fiedler's final appearance as Piglet, as he died in two and a half months before the film's release. He died before completing his voice work, so Travis Oates was brought in to finish the remaining scenes (and received credit for "additional voices") and became Piglet's new official voice actor.

It was followed by a television film produced by Walt Disney Television Animation and Polygon Pictures, Pooh's Super Sleuth Christmas Movie, released on November 20, 2007, an animated feature based on the television series My Friends Tigger & Pooh.

Plot
It is Lumpy's first Halloween with Winnie the Pooh, Roo, and their friends in the Hundred Acre Wood. The group discusses their plans for Halloween and for their first night of trick-or-treating. Tigger tells his friends about the dreaded Gobloon, a monster that comes out every Halloween to search for somebody to catch and will turn them into "jaggedy lanterns" if he catches them, but if the Gobloon is captured first, it will grant its captors one wish; Rabbit does not believe such a creature exists. After Pooh accidentally eats all of the trick-or-treat candy Rabbit collected from the Hundred Acre Wood, Roo and Lumpy set out to capture the Gobloon to wish for more. According to Tigger's directions on the map, they are able to go past the Creepy Cave then down the Slimy Slide and into the Tree of Terror later on. Entering the Creepy Cave, Lumpy and his lunchbox get stuck on some rocks, which leads Lumpy to believe that they're being followed. He desperately wants to go back, but Roo insists that they should press on, and eventually they find the Slimy Slide, and then the Tree of Terror.

When Roo and Lumpy reach the supposed Gobloon's lair, Lumpy loses his courage to catch the Gobloon. So Roo tells him the story from Boo to You Too! Winnie the Pooh, when Piglet was afraid to go trick-or-treating, but gained his courage. Roo believes that if Piglet can conquer his fears, then so can Lumpy. An inspired Lumpy helps Roo set a trap for the Gobloon, but the two end up fleeing once they think the Gobloon is returning. After encountering and fleeing from a mysterious figure (which they think is the Gobloon), Lumpy gets separated from Roo and ends up stuck in the trap they had set for the Gobloon. Lumpy is heartbroken to be alone, as he and Roo had promised to stay together during the adventure. Roo finds a Jack-o'-lantern resembling Lumpy, which makes him think his friend has been caught by the Gobloon and turned into a jaggedy lantern.

Once back with the others, Roo recruits Pooh, Piglet, Tigger, Eeyore and Rabbit to help him capture the Gobloon and save Lumpy. The group arrives at the trap and believes the Gobloon is trapped, unaware that it is actually Lumpy. Roo wishes to have his friend Lumpy back, but becomes bitterly saddened when the "Gobloon" doesn't grant his wish. Hearing Roo's voice, Lumpy calls for him, but a loud thunder blocks it, prompting him to break his way out of the trap. Roo and Lumpy are happily reunited.

The group finally goes trick-or-treating and Kanga, who was the mysterious figure from earlier, throws a Halloween party for the friends, complete with Jack-o'-lanterns she had carved in everyone's likenesses. Lumpy's Jack-o'-lantern wasn't there, she explains she made one but must have accidentally dropped it—which turns out to be the Jack-o'-lantern that Roo found. With Lumpy's first Halloween being successful, everyone from the Hundred Acre Wood enjoys the Halloween party.

Voice cast
 Jimmy Bennett as Roo
 Kyle Stanger as Lumpy the Heffalump
 Jim Cummings as Winnie-the-Pooh and Tigger
 John Fiedler as Piglet (final role)
Steve Schatzberg as Piglet (final singing role)
 Peter Cullen as Eeyore
 Ken Sansom as Rabbit
 Kath Soucie as Kanga
 David Ogden Stiers as The Narrator (final role)
 Michael Gough as Gopher (archival footage)

Production
The film was produced by DisneyToon Studios, and Toon City, a start up animation company founded by former Disney Feature Animation Florida employees.

Home media
The film was released on DVD and VHS on September 13, 2005.

Songs

References

External links 

 
 
 
 

2005 direct-to-video films
2005 animated films
2005 films
Direct-to-video sequel films
DisneyToon Studios animated films
Winnie-the-Pooh films
American films about Halloween
2000s fantasy comedy films
2000s children's fantasy films
Animated adventure films
American animated comedy films
American mystery films
2000s adventure comedy films
2000s children's comedy films
Direct-to-video adventure films
Animated films about elephants
Disney direct-to-video animated films
2000s mystery films
Winnie the Pooh (franchise)
2000s American animated films
Films scored by Mark Watters
Films with screenplays by Evan Spiliotopoulos
2005 comedy films
2000s children's animated films
2000s English-language films